Tuxedo is an unincorporated community in Henderson County, North Carolina, United States, which was originally called Lakewood.

Etymology
Tuxedo is a corruption of an Indian phrase, p tauk suttough, meaning "place of the bears."

History
Early in the 20th century, the small town of Lakewood, North Carolina, changed its name to Tuxedo (after a town in NY State) to avoid confusion with a similarly named town in North Carolina.  A large mill, the Green River Manufacturing plant, employed some 250 area workers after its completion in 1910.  That same year, the "Tuxedo" post office was established, and remained in operation until 1993. The mill, at the time called WestPoint Pepperell–Tuxedo, closed for good in 1990.

Camp Arrowhead, located in Tuxedo, was listed on the National Register of Historic Places in 2005. Tuxedo is also home to camps Mondamin, Green Cove, Talisman, Greystone and Falling Creek Camp.

Location
It is home to North Carolina's Green River Nature Preserve.

Nearby Lake Summit was formed by an impoundment of the Green River when additional power was needed for area businesses in the past.

References

Unincorporated communities in Henderson County, North Carolina
Unincorporated communities in North Carolina